Victor Vu (born November 25, 1975) is a Vietnamese-American film director, writer and producer. Along with critical acclaims, news media and public opinion have also accused Vu of plagiarism. In Vietnam's landmark first official plagiarism investigation, Vietnamese regulators found Vu's film Inferno to have copied Hollywood's 1991 film Shattered. This resulted in Inferno's disqualification from Vietnam's Golden Kite Awards. Vu called a press conference to try misinform Vietnamese public that in Hollywood, such identical similarities are the obligatory result of using Hollywood filmmaking method. He also directed the 2019 hit film, Mắt Biếc, which won many awards and brought him back to the spotlight.

Life and career

Born and raised in Southern California, Vu earned his BA in film production from Loyola Marymount University. He has directed Passport to Love, Battle of the Brides, Blood letter (Sword of the Assassin), Spirits – Oan Hon, First Morning, Inferno – Giao Lo Dinh Menh, Scandal (2012)., Vengeful Heart (2014) (Vietnamese: Quả Tim Máu), social drama Yellow Flowers on the Green Grass based on Nguyen Nhat Anh's best-selling novel  was Vietnam’s official entry for the Best Foreign Language Film category at the 89th Academy Awards but was not nominated.

Vietnam's first plagiarism investigation

Vu was investigated— in Vietnam's first official plagiarism investigation —by Vietnamese cinema regulators. After initial rave reviews and acclaims, Vietnamese news media and public began to discover Vu's film Inferno bore striking similarities to Wolfgang Petersen's 1991 film Shattered. A televised news report in Vietnam claimed that Inferno was up to 90% similar to the Hollywood film Shattered.

Vu's press conference to explain away accusations of plagiarism- Vu held a now-infamous press conference in Vietnam to deny plagiarizing the movie Shattered but it was perceived as a dishonest whitewashing attempt. In his press conference Vu acknowledged the similarities but claimed he has never heard of Shattered and explained that the similarities are due to "what's called The Creative Process." Vu explained that he uses "exactly the Hollywood method and the Hitchcock method" and because all Hollywood films follow the same mold, it's inevitable that different directors applying the same Hollywood mold to an idea will have to end up having films with A to Z similarities. Hence since Vu used the "Hollywood Thriller" mold, his film had no choice but be similar from A to Z to Hollywood thriller Shattered by coincidence, and trying to avoid similarities would be extremely difficult. Vietnamese news media made public their recording of Vu's press conference.

Facing public uproar and news media criticism, officials of the Vietnamese Cinema Administration and Vietnamese Cinema Association opened the first ever official plagiarism investigation in Vietnamese cinema. They met on March 4, 2011 to watch Vu's film and compare it with Shattered. Afterwards, they decided to eliminate the film from the Golden Kite Awards, saying that Inferno is too similar to the 1991 Hollywood film.

The extent of Vu's copying and public scandal propelled a candid public debate. Radar Van Hoa, a Vietnamese newsmagazine television program aired a bold episode which called attention to Victor Vu's plagiarism as symptomatic of a larger problem in Vietnamese cinema. Movie critic Dr Vu Ngoc Thanh said in the broadcast the extent of copying in Vu's Inferno "never happened before in the history of world cinema" and said his analysis is "it's the unavoidable result of unethical filmmaking, and reflects a lack of moral among some modern Vietnamese filmmakers including overseas Vietnamese." The news program said it hoped Vietnam's first official plagiarism investigation and expulsion of Vu's film would serve as timely warning to filmmakers to be more ethical.

As well as controversy, Vu also garnered critical and box office success. At the 2012 Golden Kite Awards, Vu's period action film, Blood Letter, won Best Feature Film, Best Director, Best Actor, Best Cinematography, and Best Sound, however on Vietnamese social media there were also accusations this film copied from various Korean and Chinese films. In the same year, Victor Vu's thriller Scandal (2012) received the Film Critics Award for Best Film and the Golden Kite for Best Supporting Actress. Vu's romantic comedy Passport to Love won Audience Choice and Best Supporting Actress at the 2009 Golden Kite Awards.  At the 18th National Film Festival, Scandal (2012) received the Golden Lotus Award for Best Feature Film, Best Director (Victor Vu) and Best Actress, while Blood letter took home the Silver Lotus Award.

Filmography

First Morning (2003)
Spirits – Oan Hon (2004)
Passport to Love (2009)
Inferno – Giao Lo Dinh Menh (2010)
Battle of the Brides (2011)
Blood letter (2012)
Scandal (2012)
Battle of the Brides 2 (2013)
Vengeful Heart (2014)
Scandal 2: Hao Quang Tro Lai (The Comeback) (2014)
Yellow Flowers on the Green Grass (2015)
 The Immortal (2018)
Dreamy Eyes (2019)
The Guardian (2021)

References

External links
 

1975 births
Living people
Male actors of Vietnamese descent
Vietnamese film directors
American people of Vietnamese descent
People from North Hollywood, Los Angeles
Film directors from Los Angeles